The grand prix de la Critique littéraire was created in 1948 by Robert André. It is awarded each year by the French PEN club to a literary essay. Since its creation, it has rewarded many leading authors and intends to promote a literary criticism of quality and, quite simply, literature.

List of laureates 
 2019: Judith Lyon-Caen, for La griffe du temps (Gallimard)
 2018: Patrick Mimouni, for Les mémoires maudites : Juifs et homosexuels dans l’œuvre et la vie de Marcel Proust (Grasset)
 2017: Lakis Proguidis, for Rabelais, que le roman commence (Editions Pierre-Guillaume de Roux)
 2016: Béatrice Commengé, for Une vie de paysages (Editions Verdier)
 2015: Pierre Boncenne, for Le Parapluie de Simon Ley, Philippe Rey
 2014: Paul Audi, for Qui témoignera pour nous ? Albert Camus, face à lui-même, Verdier
 2013: Violaine Gelly and Paul Gradvohl, for Charlotte Delbo, Fayard 
 2012: Jean-Christian Petitfils for Le Frémissement de la grâce, Le roman du Grand Meaulnes, Fayard
 2011: Nicolas Grimaldi for Les Métamorphoses de l'Amour, Éditions Grasset
 2010: Claire Blandin for Le Figaro littéraire, Vie d'un hebdomadaire politique et culturel : 1946–1971 (Nouveau Monde Éditions)
 2009: Patrick Tudoret for L'Écrivain sacrifié, vie et mort de l’émission littéraire (INA/Le Bord-de-l'Eau)
 2008: Lionel Ray for Le Procès de la vieille dame, La Différence
 2007: Élisabeth Badinter for lifetime achievement
 2006: Jean-Pierre Martin for Le Livre des hontes, Éditions du Seuil
 2005: Serge Koster for Michel Tournier ou le choix du roman, Zulma
 2004: Laurent Greilsamer for L'Éclair au front : la vie de René Char, Hachette
 2003: Michel Décaudin for lifetime achievement
 2002: Jean-Philippe Domecq for Qui a peur de la littérature ?, Mille et Une nuits
 2001: Marie-Claire Bancquart for Fin de siècle gourmande
 2000: Marc Petit for Éloge de la fiction, Fayard
 1999: Claude Dulong, member of the Institut
 1998: Vénus Khoury-Ghata
 1997: Pierre Moinot, of the Académie française
 1996: Diane de Margerie
 1995: Ghislain de Diesbach
 1994: Jean-Louis Curtis, of the Académie française
 1993: Jacqueline de Romilly, of the Académie française
 1992: René de Obaldia of the Académie française
 1990: Michel Drouin
 1989: not attributed
 1988: Claude Roy
 1987: Gorges Lubin
 1986: Jean Blot, for Ivan Gontcharov ou le réalisme impossible, L'Âge d'Homme
 1985: Roger Kempf for Dandies, Baudelaire et Cie, Grasset
 1984: Henri Troyat, of the Académie française, for Tchekhov, Flammarion
 1983: Béatrice Didier
 1979: Jacques Catteau, for La Création littéraire chez Dostoïevski
 1976: Philippe Lejeune for Lire Leiris : Autobiographie et langage, Klincksieck
 1974: José Cabanis, of the Académie française, Saint-Simon l’admirable, Éditions Gallimard
 1970: Michel Mohrt, of the Académie française, for L'Air du large
 1960: Michel Butor for Répertoire 1, Éditions de Minuit
 1952: Georges Poulet for La Distance intérieure, Plon

External links 
 Le Prix de la critique littéraire on Penclub français (23 October 2013)

Critique littéraire
Awards established in 1948
1948 establishments in France